Altrincham Grammar School may refer to:

Altrincham Grammar School for Boys
Altrincham Grammar School for Girls